EP is an EP by American rock band the 77s released in 1999 on the band's own Fools of the World label.

Track listing
 "The Years Go Down"
 "Sevens"
 "Unbalanced"
 "Blue Sky"
 "The Best I Have"

Personnel
 Mike Roe - guitar, lead vocals
 Mark Harmon - bass guitar, background vocals
 Bruce Spencer - drums

Production notes
 Executive Producers: Curt and Debbie Cosenza
 Engineers: Brad Barth, Jerry Jennings & Ralph Stover
 Mixed and mastered - Ralph Stover
 Art direction - Roe/Harmon
 Art & design - Brian Heydn

References

1999 debut EPs
The 77s albums